Itamuro Dam is a gravity dam located in Tochigi prefecture in Japan. The dam is used for power production. The catchment area of the dam is 151 km2. The dam impounds about 5  ha of land when full and can store 260 thousand cubic meters of water. The construction of the dam was started on 1968 and completed in 1973.

References

Dams in Tochigi Prefecture
1973 establishments in Japan